AP-3 complex subunit sigma-2 is a protein that in humans is encoded by the AP3S2 gene.

Interactions
AP3S2 has been shown to interact with AP3B1.

References

Further reading

External links